The Pride of the Mountains is the marching band of Western Carolina University. The band performs pre-game, halftime, and post-game shows at all Catamount Football home games and provides exhibition performances throughout the Carolinas. Unlike most college marching bands, the Pride of the Mountains designs, creates, and performs one perfected halftime show other than doing different performances every week.

The Pride of the Mountains has been featured several times as an exhibition band at the BOA Grand National Championships (a showcase for the nation's top high school marching bands) and at four BOA regional competitions in Atlanta, Georgia, once in the Rose Bowl Parade in 2011, and was featured in the Macy's Thanksgiving Day Parade in New York City in 2014 & 2019. The Tournament of Champions is hosted on the Western Carolina campus every year in the fall in which 25 high schools are invited to the campus to compete.

History
The Western Carolina University marching band was founded in 1938 with 23 students. In 1991 the band numbered 88 total members, including 18 dancers. Since that time the band has experienced a steady growth to its present membership level of just over 500 members making them the second largest university marching band in the United States.
The marching band is open to all Western Carolina University, Southwestern Community College, and Haywood Community College students regardless of class or major, with approximately 60% of its members comprising non-music majors. The class is available for zero, one, or two credits to encourage the optimal number of members.

Recent Honors
In 1998, 2003, 2008, 2012, 2015, and 2022 the Pride of the Mountains Marching Band was featured as an exhibition show at the Bands of America Grand National Championships in Indianapolis.  In 2009, the "Pride of the Mountains" marching band was selected as one of the five best collegiate marching bands in the nation by the College Band Directors National Association and featured in the book "Marching Bands and Drumlines: Secrets of Success from the Best of the Best" by Paul Buyer.

BOA Grand Nationals
Recognized on both a regional and national level as one of the premier marching bands in the nation, the Pride of the Mountains has traveled to Indianapolis to perform in the Lucas Oil Stadium.

The Pride of the Mountains first performed in Lucas Oil Stadium in 2008 with their production of "Work It!"  The show had four movements including recognition to such popular artists as the "Blue Man Group."  The band performed at both the semi-finals and finals portions of the competition.

WCU's 2012 production, entitled "How We Roll" included four movements titled, "Pop," "Lock," "Drop," "Stop," and "Roll," and featured a variety of artists.

Sudler Trophy
The Pride of the Mountains won the Sudler Trophy in 2009. The award is often referred to as the "Heisman Trophy of collegiate marching bands". Western Carolina is the only institution in the state of North Carolina and the first member of the Southern Conference selected for this very prestigious award.

Tournament of Roses Parade
The Pride of the Mountains were invited to participate in the Tournament of Roses Parade 2011 located in Pasadena, California.  The 2011 theme of the parade was "Building Dreams Friendships & Memories."  Both the band and the university were given national attention for both their performance in the parade as well as at the annual BandFest presented by Remo.  At BandFest the Pride of the Mountains performed their field show of "Rock U."  They were voted as the best band in the 2011 Rose Parade poll created by KTLA-TV with 72,287 votes making them the most voted musical group of any of the parade's participants.

Macy's Thanksgiving Day Parade
In 2014, the Pride of the Mountains performed in the Macy's Thanksgiving Day Parade. The band performed with 510 members participating, and announcers described their performance as "This is the largest band this parade has seen in decades", "This is the best of the best", and "They don't mess around at Western Carolina".

In 2019, the Pride of the Mountains performed in the Macy's Thanksgiving Day Parade again.

Pep bands
The "Cathouse Band" pep band plays at home basketball games during basketball season. A band of 100+ members for both men's and women's basketball games is open to all students. The pep bands travel with the WCU basketball teams to end of season conference and NCAA tournaments.

"Purple Thunder" is a standing, indoor percussion ensemble that performs during halftime at select home basketball games. The group is chosen through an audition process. In addition to the drums (snares, tenors, and basses), the group also includes the WCU Cheer and Dance Teams, as well as an electronic sound system that provides the pop music that accompanies the percussion. The group made their debut performance in the spring of 2008.

Traditions

March to the Stadium
Approximately one hour prior to the start of home Catamount Football games, the marching band lines up for the march to the stadium. The march is complete with police escort. The band lines up in the street between Scott Resident Hall and the dining hall and marches down the road past the Fine and Performing Arts Center and halts in front of the stadium to perform the fight song for the crowd of tailgating fans.

Singing the Alma Mater
The singing of the Alma Mater occurs during the pregame show. It is sung right before the National Anthem, which marks the beginning to the spirit sequence, in which the band spells out different variations of the university's mascot. The Alma Mater is also sung after the post game performance before the band dismisses for the day.

Tournament of Champions
The Pride of the Mountain's Tournament of Champions is an invitational competition that invites 25 of the Southeast's top high school marching bands to the Cullowhee campus annually. This events attracts nearly 10,000 musicians and spectators. Pride of the Mountains also performs twice on this day as an exhibition show.

Other ensembles
Wind Ensemble - Directed by Dr. Margaret Underwood, this auditioned ensemble of 40-50 musicians performs a challenging repertory that includes standard literature, contemporary works, and premieres of commissioned works. This group meets every semester.
Jazz Band - Directed by jazz pianist & composer Pavel Wlosok, this auditioned group performs jazz standards and new works for jazz band. This ensemble meets every semester.
Symphonic Band - This auditioned ensemble of 50-60 musicians, directed by Dr. Jack A. Eaddy Jr., performs a repertory of both standard and contemporary works. This ensemble meets every semester.
Concert Band - Directed by Mr. Trevor Bailey, this ensemble of 60-70 musicians serves as both an auditioned ensemble for music majors and an audition free ensemble for non-majors and performs literature of the medium to medium advanced category. This group meets in only the Spring semester.
Artist-in-Residence Orchestra - With a professional string section from the Asheville Symphony Orchestra, this auditioned ensemble performs orchestral masterworks with wind, brass, and percussion students.
Civic Orchestra - A college and community chamber orchestra, led by Dr. Damon Sink.
Percussion Ensemble - Led by Dr. Adam Groh, this group performs challenging works for various combinations of percussion instruments.
Studio Ensembles - Most of the wind and brass studios offer small ensembles of like instruments that are conducted or coached by the studio teacher. These include the Tuba and Euphonium Ensemble, Trumpet Ensemble, Trombone Choir, and Saxophone Quartet.
Gamelan Ensemble - Consists of tuned percussion instruments (gongs, chimes, etc.) from Indonesia and is directed by Dr. Will Peebles.
Concert Choir - Directed by Dr. Allison Thorp, this ensemble features around 20 to 30 auditioned musicians who perform a challenging and diverse repertory of choral music.
Catamount Singers & Electric Soul - This vocal ensemble performs popular music combined with choreography. This group includes a full rhythm and horn section called Electric Soul. It is the primary ensemble of the Commercial & Electronic music program at WCU.
Mountain Winds - Directed by Bob Buckner and Jon Henson, is community ensemble is open musicians around the Western North Carolina area.

Service organizations
Phi Mu Alpha Sinfonia
Kappa Kappa Psi
Sigma Alpha Iota

References

External links
Pride of the Mountains
Western Carolina University
Western Carolina University at Macy's Thanksgiving Day Parade (2014)
Pride of the Mountains Marching Band at Macy's Thanksgiving Day Parade (2014)
WCU's Purple Thunder - "Hit The Lights"

Western Carolina University
Southern Conference marching bands
Musical groups established in 1938
1938 establishments in North Carolina